The Golden Easter Egg is an Australian Group 1 greyhound race held annually at Sydney's Wentworth Park racetrack in Glebe. In 2012 it was listed as the richest greyhound race in the world.

History 
The first Golden Easter Egg was held at Wentworth Park, Sydney in 1990. Held annually on Easter Saturday it carries Group 1 status from AGRA, the code's racing regulator. The Golden Easter Egg carnival is in fact held over three weekends, commencing with heat events (8 in total), then followed by Semi Finals week (4 in total) and the Final Event in the third week. The first and second placegetters from the four semi final events fill the places in the final.

The Golden Easter Egg now provides prize money of around $1,000,000 ($250,000 to the winner) making it one the richest greyhound carnivals in Australia.

Honour Roll 
Golden Easter Egg Winners since inaugural 1990 race are:

See also
Greyhound racing in Australia

References

Greyhound racing competitions in Australia
Sports competitions in Sydney
Greyhound racing in Australia